The Șușița (in its upper course also: Straja or Amaru) is a right tributary of the river Jiu in Romania. It discharges into the Jiu near the city Târgu Jiu.

Tributaries

The following rivers are tributaries to the river Șușița (from source to mouth):

Left: Grivele, Cartianu, Cracu, Zănoaga, Răchițelii, Strâmbu, Jara, Mitări, Cornul
Right: Valea Boului, Cârligu, Frasin, Măcriș, Corcotu, Țiganu, Tragoe, Valea Mare, Balta Verde, Richita, Valea Socilor, Suseni, Iaz

References

Rivers of Romania
Rivers of Gorj County